The San Miguelito Oil Field is a large and currently productive oil field in the hills northwest of the city of Ventura in southern California in the United States. The field is close to the coastline, with U.S. Highway 101 running past at the base of the hills, and is sandwiched between the larger Ventura Oil Field to the east and the Rincon Oil Field, which is partially offshore, to the north and northwest. Discovered in 1931, and with about 7 million barrels of oil remaining out of its original 125 million, it ranks 44th in the state by size, and at the beginning of 2009 had 61 producing oil wells, all operated by Vintage Production California LLC, a subsidiary of Occidental Petroleum.

Geographic setting

The oil field is one of several following the east-west trend of the Transverse Ranges: to the west is the Rincon Oil Field and the offshore Dos Cuadras field, and to the east the much larger Ventura Oil Field. On the coast between Ventura and Carpinteria, the stretch known locally as "the Rincon", the hills rise steeply from the shore, with the coastal U.S. Highway 101 occupying much of the narrow strip between the beach and the sharply rising hills. A cluster of seaside homes is on the ocean side of Highway 101 at Solimar Beach (marked as "Dulah" on the USGS topographic map of the area). One of the field's pumpjacks is visible on the mountain side of the highway, at sea level, just north of the Solimar Beach exit; almost all the other oil wells are out of the line of sight from any public road, as are the other oilfield structures (tank farms, processing units, and others).

The predominant vegetation in the hills is chaparral and coastal sage scrub. Terrain on the hills is steep, and the unpaved access roads make numerous switchbacks. Some of the hillsides are bare where landslides have stripped them, and the terrain in this area is unusually prone to landslides.

Climate in the area is Mediterranean, with cool, rainy winters and mild, dry summers, cooled by morning coastal clouds. Runoff from the oil field is west and southwest down ephemeral, seasonal drainages into the Pacific Ocean.

Geology

The San Miguelito field is an accumulation of oil along the westernmost portion of the Ventura anticline, bounded on the north by the Grubb Thrust Fault, where the fault has pushed another closed anticline above the end of the Ventura Anticline. Petroleum-bearing units are sands of Pliocene and Miocene age, and are given numerical designations increasing with depth: 1st Grubb, 2nd Grubb, down to 5th Grubb (as well as an additional "Grubb D" zone for units lower than 5th Grubb). These units are present on either side of the fault, but are offset by about 4,000 vertical feet. The California Department of Conservation groups together the Grubb 1-3 zones, Grubb 4-5 zones, Grubb D (Deep) zones as three distinct producing horizons.

The oil is medium-grade with an API gravity of 31 in the first four Grubb zones, 25 in the 5th.

History, production and operations
While the adjacent large Ventura Avenue oil field was discovered in 1919, it was not until 1931 that prospectors thought of searching for oil near the western end of the Ventura Anticline, where the borehole had to reach a considerable depth before finding oil. It flowed over 600 barrels a day, and development of the field began.

In 1944 the 2nd Grubb Zone was discovered, and in 1950, the 3rd Grubb. Peak production from the field was in 1951 at 4.5 million barrels of oil. Further zones were discovered, with the 4th Grubb coming online in 1970, and the 5th Grubb in 1979.

In order to increase reservoir pressure, several waterflooding projects have been undertaken on the field, commencing in 1955. Most of the water injection has been done in the Grubb 1-3 zones; only one waterflood well was active as of 2009 in Grubb 4-5, with 31 in Grubb 1-3.

In 1993, Vintage Petroleum acquired both the San Miguelito and adjacent Rincon fields from Mobil, Conoco, and Santa Fe Energy. To improve operational efficiency, Vintage combined the two adjacent oil fields into a single operating unit. Occidental Petroleum acquired Vintage in 2006, retaining their name and making them a wholly owned subsidiary, and still operates the Rincon and San Miguelito fields under the Vintage banner.

References
 California Oil and Gas Fields, Volumes I, II and III. Vol. I (1998), Vol. II (1992), Vol. III (1982). California Department of Conservation, Division of Oil, Gas, and Geothermal Resources (DOGGR). 1,472 pp. Ventura Oil Field information pp. 572–574. PDF file available on CD from www.consrv.ca.gov.
 California Department of Conservation, Oil and Gas Statistics, Annual Report, December 31, 2008.
 Keller, Margaret. Ventura Basin Province, U.S. Geological Survey Digital Data Series DDS-30, Release 2, one CD-ROM, 19 p. + supporting maps, figures, and tables. Available here

Notes

Oil fields in California
Geology of Ventura County, California
Geography of Ventura County, California
Landmarks in Ventura County, California